Acleris placata is a species of moth of the family Tortricidae. It is found in India (Assam), Taiwan and Japan.

The wingspan is 14–18 mm.

References

Moths described in 1912
placata
Moths of Asia